is a Japanese football player who plays for AS Laranja Kyoto. His mother is Japanese and his father is Tanzanian.

Club statistics

References

External links
 Sanfrecce profile 

1983 births
Living people
Association football people from Kyoto Prefecture
Japanese footballers
Japanese people of Tanzanian descent
J1 League players
Sanfrecce Hiroshima players
Zweigen Kanazawa players
Association football defenders